Richard Wild was an American soccer player who earned one cap with the U.S. national team in a 10-0 loss to England on May 27, 1964.  In 1964, he played with New York Hota of the German American Soccer League.

References

American soccer players
United States men's international soccer players
German-American Soccer League players
New York Hota players
Possibly living people
Year of birth missing
Place of birth missing

Association footballers not categorized by position